Grangecon is a village in County Wicklow, Ireland. It has a population of about 200 people, and is located between Baltinglass and Dunlavin.

History 

While the name Grange Con is said to be of Celtic origin the earliest recorded history of it is from the Middle Ages when the Abbot of Baltinglass Abbey had a castle built there. The monks are also said to have had a mill there powered by the local stream. Most of the surrounding land belonged to the Abbey at the time.
Following the dissolution of the monasteries, Thomas Eustace was in 1541 made Viscount Baltinglass and granted the lands of the Abbey including the Castle and lands at Grangecon. These were forfeited in 1581 following a rebellion by the third Viscount and subsequently granted to Sir Henry Harrington. It appears that these lands remained in the Harrington family for a number of generations.

The house at Grangecon Demesne later became the seat of the O'Mahony clan and remained so until about 1930 when Pierce O'Mahony, the last "the O'Mahony" died. See  for more detailed information about the O'Mahony connection with Grangecon.
Some ruins of an older castle still exist in the grounds but these are quite minimal.
Grangecon Demesne is now home to the well-known Grangecon Stud, breeder of top grade thoroughbred racehorses.

The Hall 

Grangecon village is still known by many as "The Hall".

Geography 
The village is set in a valley, amid the low rolling hills of West Wicklow. The Wicklow Mountains are to the east, while to the west lie the lowlands of Kildare and the midlands.

Transport 
Grangecon railway station opened on 1 Sept 1885, closed for passenger traffic on 27 January 1947, closed for goods traffic on 10 March 1947, and finally closed altogether on 1 April 1959. The station building and Station Master's house still exist today as private residences. Part of the original railway cutting can still be seen in the village, as can an original railway overbridge. There is little by way of public transport serving the village now apart from school buses and an occasional service by the Wicklow Rural Transport service.

Amenities and sport
The village has two pubs, one of which also serves as the local grocery store, though the local post office, that had existed in the village since the mid-1840s, was closed down in 2007. There is a small national school, and secondary education is available in several schools in other nearby towns. A modern Catholic church stands in the centre of the village, while there is a Church of Ireland church at Ballynure, a short distance away.

There is a local community owned park in the village where the local soccer club, Grangecon A.F.C, play their home fixtures and the local school children play football and hurling while football and hurling at juvenile levels and football up to senior level are played at the Stratford / Grangecon GAA club.

It is located in an area of mixed agriculture, and has much bloodstock activity including the breeding and training of racehorses. Paddy Sleator, a trainer of National Hunt horses, had his establishment here, as did Francis Flood. There are also several stud farms in the locality.

See also 
List of towns and villages in Ireland

References

External links 
 Grangecon community website

Towns and villages in County Wicklow